Santiago José García Mazo (1768–1849) was a Spanish rhetorician, pedagogue and writer.

Works
Sermons preached... and rhetorical preamble notes, 1847.
To read the Christian story from childhood to old age, that is, Compendium of the history of religion out of the holy books, 1843.
The catechism of Christian doctrine explained ..., Valladolid, 1837.
Daily piety brief or spiritual rules.

Spanish male writers
People from the Province of Ávila
1768 births
1849 deaths